Lohan Potgieter is a South African rugby union player for the . His regular position is flanker.

Potgieter was named in the  squad for the 2021 Currie Cup Premier Division.

References

South African rugby union players
Living people
Rugby union flankers
Free State Cheetahs players
Year of birth missing (living people)
Cheetahs (rugby union) players